Affector may refer to:
 a neuron that directly activates a muscle
 a thematic relation similar to agent

See also 
 Affecter, Attic vase painter from the 6th century BCE
 Effector (disambiguation)
 Affect (disambiguation)